The Legislative Assembly of Umbria (Assemblea Legislativa dell'Umbria) is the parliament of Umbria.

It was first elected in 1970, when the ordinary regions were instituted, on the basis of the Constitution of Italy of 1948.

Composition
The Regional Council was originally composed of 30 regional councillors. Following the decree-law n. 138 of 13 August 2011, the number of regional councillors was reduced to 20, with an additional seat reserved for the President of the Region.

Political groups
The Legislative Assembly is currently composed of the following political groups:

See also
Regional council
Politics of Umbria
President of Umbria

References

External links
Legislative Assembly of Umbria

Politics of Umbria
Italian Regional Councils
Umbria